Tajikistan competed at the 2000 Summer Olympics in Sydney, Australia.

Athletics

Men

Women

Swimming 

Men

Women

References
Official Olympic Reports

Nations at the 2000 Summer Olympics
2000
2000 in Tajikistani sport